Hotel de France may refer to:

 Hotel de France (Le Mans / La Chartre sur le Loir), historic hotel in La Chartre Sur Le Loir, France
 Hotel de France (Conakry), in Conarky, Guinea, a.k.a. Grand Hotel de L'Independance 
 Hôtel de France (film), French drama directed by Patrice Chéreau, 1987